Abdulsamed "Appie" Abdullahi (born 19 January 1997) is a professional footballer who plays as a midfielder. Born in Holland, he represents the Somalia national team.

Club career
Abdullahi signed his first professional contract with FC Den Bosch on 9 August 2019. Abdullahi made his professional debut with Jong PSV on 12 August 2019.

International career
Born in the Netherlands, Abdullahi is of Somali descent. Abdullahi represented the Somalia national football team in a 1–0 2022 FIFA World Cup qualification win  over Zimbabwe on 5 September 2019.

References

External links
 

1997 births
Living people
Footballers from Tilburg
Association football midfielders
People with acquired Somali citizenship
Somalian footballers
Somalia international footballers
Dutch footballers
Dutch people of Somali descent
FC Den Bosch players
Eerste Divisie players
Tweede Divisie players
Ergotelis F.C. players
Super League Greece 2 players